Luc Jacquet (born 5 December 1967) is a French film director and screenwriter. He wrote and directed the film March of the Penguins, which won an Oscar for Best Documentary Feature in 2005 and received a nomination for the Writers Guild of America Award for Best Documentary Screenplay. He also directed The Fox And the Child. It was released in Britain and Ireland in slightly re-edited dubbed English-language version with narration by Kate Winslet, and was released in the United States on 29 February 2008.

His 2015 film Ice and the Sky was selected to close the 2015 Cannes Film Festival.

Filmography
Une plage et trop de manchots (2001) TV featurette
Sous le signe du serpent (2004) TV featurette
Des manchots et des hommes (2004) featurette Directed with Jérôme Maison
March of the Penguins (2005)
The Fox and the Child (2007)
Il était une forêt (2013)
Ice and the Sky (2015)

References

External links 

  Luc Jacquet's Production Company Official Web Site
  Official Web Site

1967 births
Living people
French film directors
Directors of Best Documentary Feature Academy Award winners
Writers from Bourg-en-Bresse
French documentary filmmakers
French male screenwriters
French screenwriters
French cinematographers
French-language film directors